Nikula is a Finnish surname.

Geographical distribution
As of 2014, 52.3% of all known bearers of the surname Nikula were residents of Finland (frequency 1:2,320), 25.6% of Ukraine (1:39,331), 6.4% of the United States (1:1,245,694), 4.3% of Sweden (1:50,756), 2.1% of Hungary (1:104,430), 1.3% of Canada (1:634,448), 1.3% of Russia (1:2,531,424) and 1.2% of the Democratic Republic of the Congo (1:1,343,291).

In Finland, the frequency of the surname was higher than national average (1:2,320) in the following regions:
 1. Central Ostrobothnia (1:481)
 2. North Ostrobothnia (1:615)
 3. Lapland (1:1,025)
 4. Åland (1:1,196)
 5. Kymenlaakso (1:1,295)
 6. Southwest Finland (1:2,004)

Notable people
Jone Nikula (born 1970), Finnish television and radio personality
Paavo Nikula (born 1942), Finnish politician
Pentti Nikula (born 1939), Finnish pole vaulter
Riitta Nikula (born 1944), Finnish art historian

References

Finnish-language surnames
Surnames of Finnish origin